Vladimir Aleksandrovich Engelgardt (December 3, 1894, in Moscow – July 10, 1984, in Moscow) was a Soviet biochemist, academician of the Soviet Academy of Medical Sciences (1944), academician of the Soviet Academy of Sciences (1953), and Hero of Socialist Labor (1969). He was the founder and the first director of the Institute of Molecular Biology of the Russian Academy of Sciences (later renamed the Engelhardt Institute of Molecular Biology in his honor).

Vladimir Engelgardt is considered to be one of the founders of molecular biology in the Soviet Union.

Honours and awards
 Stalin Prize for the study of muscle tissue (1943)
 USSR State Prize (1979)
 Hero of Socialist Labour (1969)
 Five Orders of Lenin
 Order of the Patriotic War, 2nd class
 Order of the Red Banner of Labour
 Lomonosov Gold Medal (1968)

References

1894 births
1984 deaths
Russian chemists
Heroes of Socialist Labour
Stalin Prize winners
Recipients of the USSR State Prize
Recipients of the Order of Lenin
Recipients of the Lomonosov Gold Medal
Full Members of the USSR Academy of Sciences
Academicians of the USSR Academy of Medical Sciences
Foreign associates of the National Academy of Sciences
Foreign Members of the Bulgarian Academy of Sciences
Academic staff of Moscow State University
Members of the German Academy of Sciences at Berlin
Fellows of the Royal Society of Edinburgh
Soviet biochemists